The Delhi Metrolite is a planned Metrolite line under Delhi Metro.

This 19.09 km line would consist of 21 stations (Kirti Nagar - Bamnoli Village). This Line is currently awaiting approval from Delhi and Central Government.

Stations 

The stations proposed for the Metro Lite are:

See also 

 Metrolite
 Delhi Metro
 DMRC

References 

Delhi Metro lines